The Minister for Local Government in Ghana is responsible for decentralised administration of the country. This minister is also responsible for enhancing the development of the rural areas of Ghana. The title of the position has been altered under some governments to reflect this.

List of ministers

References

Politics of Ghana
Local Government